William Bauer may refer to:

 Bill Bauer (American football), American football coach
 Bill Bauer (poet) (1932–2010), Canadian poet
 Billy Bauer (1915–2005), American musician
 William Edward Bauer (born  1926), Canadian diplomat
 William J. Bauer (born 1926), American judge
 William W. Bauer (1892–1967), American physician and health writer

See also
 Willy Bauer, German motocross racer